Robert Clifton Henley (born January 30, 1973) is an American professional baseball coach, former Major League catcher and former minor league manager.  A longtime member of the Washington Nationals' organization, he was promoted to Major League third-base coach on the staff of new Nationals' manager Matt Williams on November 19, 2013.

Playing career

He graduated from Mobile County High School in Grand Bay, Alabama, and was selected in the 26th round by the Montreal Expos (predecessors to the Nationals) in the 1991 Major League Baseball draft. Fighting persistent injuries, Henley broke into pro baseball in 1993, then progressed through the Montreal farm system, batting over .300 twice.

In , he saw his only Major League service. He spent the early part of the season on the disabled list, and then appeared in 50 minor league games with the Triple-A Ottawa Lynx and the Class A Jupiter Hammerheads before making his MLB debut as a defensive replacement in the eighth inning of a 6–1 loss to the Pittsburgh Pirates on July 19 at Olympic Stadium.  He walked in his first MLB plate appearance, and, the following day, when he started against the Philadelphia Phillies, he singled off Curt Schilling in his first official at bat.

Henley would appear in 41 games, starting 30 at catcher, for the 1998 Expos, as he and Mike Hubbard backed up regular Chris Widger. He amassed 35 hits and 11 walks in 132 plate appearances, batting .304 and collecting three homers (off Pedro Astacio, Kirt Ojala and Bobby Jones) and eight doubles.  On September 25, his penultimate appearance of the season, Henley went 4-for-4 with two doubles and three runs batted in against the St. Louis Cardinals.

But 1998 would be his only Major League season, and his last full season as an active player. Beset by elbow miseries, he played in only two minor league games in 1999 and missed the 2000 and 2001 campaigns completely.  Released by the Expos, he got into one minor league game with the Class A Hickory Crawdads, a Pittsburgh Pirates affiliate, in 2002 before retiring from the field.

Coaching career
He was fired with Williams and the rest of the coaching staff after the 2015 season, but was rehired to serve under new manager Dusty Baker. His contract expired after the 2017 season, but Henley was again rehired as third base coach, becoming the only holdover from Baker's coaching staff to join the new staff headed by manager Dave Martinez. On October 10, 2021, Henley was removed from his major league role but remained in the organization in a player development role.

References

External links

1973 births
Living people
American expatriate baseball players in Canada
Baseball coaches from Alabama
Baseball players from Alabama
Burlington Bees players
Gulf Coast Expos players
Harrisburg Senators players
Hickory Crawdads players
Jamestown Expos players
Jupiter Hammerheads players
Major League Baseball catchers
Major League Baseball third base coaches
Montreal Expos players
Ottawa Lynx players
Sportspeople from Mobile, Alabama
Washington Nationals coaches
American expatriate baseball players in Australia